Rosa Cedrón (Monforte de Lemos, Lugo, October 25, 1972) is a Spanish Galician singer and cello player, known for being the voice for nine years in the group Luar na Lubre, and collaborating on records by musicians such as Mike Oldfield.

Career
From childhood, Cedrón's vocation focused on the cello. She was a member of the Municipal Chamber Orchestra of A Coruña, and later, a music teacher in Ferrol. She was also a teacher of Sabela Ramil, a contestant of the television pop music talent contest  Star Academy (Operación Triunfo) 2018, being a finalist in fourth position; Cedrón and Ramil sang "Negro Caravel" at the program's Christmas gala.

Luar na Lubre (1996-2005)
Cedrón began to collaborate with Luar na Lubre, initially as a cellist, but ended up also being a vocalist and with great success, a fact that the musician Mike Oldfield would observe, inviting her to participate in the recording of Tubular Bells III, something that increased Cedrón's popularity and the success of this folk music group. For nine years, Cedrón did extensive work with Luar na Lubre, performing on the best stages, recording several albums, and collecting recognition awards for her music. Meanwhile, she combined her intense career with other projects: recordings with the flamenco music group ; the participation in the soundtrack, "Blanca Madison" or "Illegal", put her versatility to the test.

Solo (2005-)
In 2005, Cedrón left Luar na Lubre and thereafter, she dedicated himself to her solo career, publishing her first solo album Entre dous mares in 2007. In 2010, she released a record with Cristina Pato, with Cedrón the voice and Pato on the piano. In 2016, she published Nada que perder, her second solo album. Recorded at the Casa de Tolos studio, the album Nómade was released in 2021. It was produced by Sergio Moure, and included the musicians Xavier Cedrón and the pianist Miguel Artus.

Awards and honours
In 2019, Cedrón received the Rebulir Award from Galician Culture in the music category.

Discography

Luar na Lubre
 1997: Plenilunio
 1999: Cabo do Mundo
 2001: XV Aniversario
 2002: Espiral
 2004: Hai un Paraiso

Solo
 2007: Entre dous mares
 2016: Nada que perder
 2020: Nómade

Collaborations
 1998: Tubular Bells III with Mike Oldfield
 2010: Soas: muller with Cristina Pato
 2011: Mira hacia el cielo with Enrique Ramil
 2013: Cantando a Galicia with Paco Lodeiro and Sito Sedes

References

External links 
 Official website
 
 
 

1972 births
Living people
People from Monforte de Lemos
Singers from Galicia (Spain)
Musicians from Galicia (Spain)
Spanish cellists